Cajati is a municipality in the state of São Paulo in Brazil. The population is 28,494 (2020 est.) in an area of 454 km2. The elevation is 75 m.

The municipality contains part of the  Rio Turvo State Park, created in 2008.
It contains the  Lavras Sustainable Development Reserve and the  Cajati Environmental Protection Area, created at the same time.
It contains part of the  Caverna do Diabo State Park, also created in 2008.
It contains 3% of the  Planalto do Turvo Environmental Protection Area, created at the same time.

References

Sources

Municipalities in São Paulo (state)